Soluk Bon-e Olya (also Romanized as Solūk Bon-e ‘Olyā; also known as Solūk Bon-e Bālā) is a village in Shuil Rural District, Rahimabad District, Rudsar County, Gilan Province, Iran. At the 2006 census, its population was 13, in 4 families.

References 

Populated places in Rudsar County